The 1939 VPI Gobblers football team represented Virginia Agricultural and Mechanical College and Polytechnic Institute in the 1939 college football season.  The team was led by their head coach Henry Redd and finished with a record of four wins, five losses and one tie (4–5–1).

Schedule

Season summary

Washington & Lee
The game against Washington & Lee on October 28 was the first game played at Lynchburg Municipal Stadium.

Players

Roster

Varsity letter winners
Twenty-two players received varsity letters for their participation on the 1939 VPI team.

References

VPI
Virginia Tech Hokies football seasons
VPI Gobblers